Dawn, also known as the Girl with a Lily is an oil painting by the French artist William-Adolphe Bouguereau. It was one of his most notable works. Its dimensions are 214.9 × 107 cm.

It is exhibited at the Birmingham Museum of Art.

References

 

1881 paintings
Mythological paintings by William-Adolphe Bouguereau
Women in art
Erotic art
Nude art
19th-century allegorical paintings
Allegorical paintings by French artists